Albert Courtot (4 May 1891 – 7 January 1955) was a French racing cyclist. He rode in the 1927 Tour de France.

References

1891 births
1955 deaths
French male cyclists
Place of birth missing